Michael Kelly (born June 23, 1975) is a Democratic member of the Illinois House of Representatives from the 15th district since his appointment on November 23, 2021. The 15th district, located in the Chicago area, includes parts of Glenview, Morton Grove, Niles, Park Ridge, and Skokie and includes parts of the Chicago neighborhoods of Albany Park, Forest Glen, Irving Park, Jefferson Park, North Park, and Norwood Park.

He was appointed in 2021 to succeed longtime Democratic State Representative John C. D'Amico, who retired earlier in November that year.

Early life, education, and career
Kelly grew up in Albany Park, Chicago. He attended Saint Edward Elementary School and St. Patrick High School. He graduated from Quincy University with a degree in business management. He previously worked on political campaigns for then-State Representative John C. D'Amico, Alderman Samantha Nugent, and former Alderman Margaret Laurino. He has served as a firefighter for the Chicago Fire Department since 2003 and works as an athletic director for Saint Edward School.

As of July 3, 2022, Representative Kelly is a member of the following Illinois House committees:

 Cities & Villages Committee (HCIV)
 Police & Fire Committee (SHPF)
 Transportation: Vehicles & Safety Committee (HVES)

External links
Representative Michael Kelly (D) at the Illinois General Assembly website

References

21st-century American politicians
Living people
People from Chicago
Democratic Party members of the Illinois House of Representatives
1975 births